Sudbury and Woodbridge was a county constituency centred on the towns of Sudbury and Woodbridge in Suffolk.  It returned one Member of Parliament (MP) to the House of Commons of the Parliament of the United Kingdom.

History
The constituency was created by the Representation of the People Act 1948 for the 1950 general election, replacing the majority of both of the abolished county divisions of Sudbury and Woodbridge. It included the towns of Sudbury and Hadleigh, previously in the Sudbury constituency, and Woodbridge and Felixstowe, previously in the Woodbridge constituency.

It was abolished for the 1983 general election, and split between the new county constituencies of Suffolk Coastal (Woodbridge and Felixstowe) and South Suffolk (Sudbury and Hadleigh).

Boundaries
The Borough of Sudbury, the Urban Districts of Felixstowe, Hadleigh, and Woodbridge, the Rural Districts of Cosford, Melford, and Samford, and part of the Rural District of Deben.

Members of Parliament

Elections

Elections in the 1950s

Elections in the 1960s

Elections in the 1970s

References

Parliamentary constituencies in Suffolk (historic)
Constituencies of the Parliament of the United Kingdom established in 1950
Constituencies of the Parliament of the United Kingdom disestablished in 1983
Woodbridge, Suffolk
Sudbury, Suffolk